Ondřej Smetana may refer to:

 Ondřej Smetana (footballer) (born 1982), Czech footballer
 Ondřej Smetana (racing driver), Czech racing driver
 Ondřej Smetana (Speedway rider), Czech speedway rider